Contship Containerlines was a global container carrier operating from 1969 to 2005 in the India/Pakistan, Levant, Australia/New Zealand, South America and Asia trade, mainly to and from Europe. 
The company was founded just as containerization was beginning and continuously grew up with the growth of this market.

History
In 1968 Dr. Angelo Ravano founded Contship SA in Switzerland. The company's first sailing was undertaken by the MV Sea Maid from Fos to Casablanca in October 1969. 

During 1970 an agency arm was set up in Milan and terminal operations were started at La Spezia. Some  were handled in the first year. A European network with subsidiaries in Spain and the Netherlands in 1973 and 1974 was built up. The transfer of the agency representation in Milan to Genoa in 1974 was accompanied by the expansion of the service portfolio to eastern Mediterranean ports. In 1976 Ellerman City Liners appointed Contship's agency arm in Portugal. 

1977 saw the formation of a UK subsidiary and the launch of the first direct container service between Europe and India. It was the first shipping line to handle containers in Bombay (now Mumbai). More experience of working partnerships was gained from 1979 through the formation of the Contship Gulf Line as a joint service agreement with Ellerman City Lines, operating a new service that linked Europe with the Near East. 

The company moved its headquarters from Switzerland to Felixstowe and then Ipswich, thus becoming a part of the UK's shipping establishment. The early 80s saw Contship expanding and widening their interests. In Spain, they won the agency representation for Trans Freight Lines. In the UK, they shared in the setting up of Arrowfreight, a freight forwarding operation. Meanwhile, a group holding company was established in Curaçao.

Eagle Container Line linking North Europe and the Mediterranean with Australia commenced in 1982 as a non-conference service. With new agency companies in France and Italy, the start of the Eurasia Container Line and the introduction of  vessels into the Eagle service, 1985 was a busy year. 1986 saw the formation of Ocean Star Container Line, operating a westbound round-the world service. The following year saw the commencement of the Medipas service operating between the Mediterranean and India and Pakistan. In 1987 the Contship Containerlines brand was established. It gradually took over management control of Contship's container shipping services, agency and intermodal activities. At the end of the second decade, Ocean Star was expanded to include an Australian and Far East leg and North European ports of call. With the acquisition of Costa Containerline they started a service from the Mediterranean to the US East and Gulf Coasts.

The 90s saw new vessels for the Eagle service, a revision of the Costa operation and start of the Salerno Terminal operations. 1991 was a year that saw changes to the Indian Sub-Continent service with CMB Transport joining Contship Eurasia Line through a joint service agreement. Joint service agreements have always played an important part in Contship's activities. In 1993 just such an agreement with P&O brought a restructuring of the Eagle service and an upgrade of Ocean Star with the addition of larger tonnage. Further tonnage upgrading was made to Contship's Eurasia service and the Gulf Line was reconfigured as Contship Levant Line in association with four partners in 1994. With terminal  operations starting in Savona and Gioia Tauro in 1995 and with restructuring of the Eurasia/Medasia services and the establishing of a Med-US Gulf and Mexico service they made further service improvements. 

In 1996 the Levant service was modified and the Mediterranean-US and Mexico service was upgraded. The company also took over the Pro Line, thereby bringing Contship Containerlines into the trade between North Europe and South America. In 1997 Contship was acquired by CP Ships, being one of the few shipping lines CP took over at a profitable level. The Ocean Star service was retonnaged and Contship entered into partnership with the CMA-CGM Group and Marfret in 1998. 1999 was a year of consolidating existing operations and building a platform for further growth. They made significant cost efficiencies, improved their profitability and entered new and complementary trade lanes including the US West Coast to the Mediterranean. The same year Contship launched its Internet site and was the first container shipping line to paint its web address on the hull of all its vessels as mobile advertising.

In 2001 a new service between China and Europe was established in co-operation with CMA-CGM, however this trade had to be withdrawn from the market in early March 2003 due to lack of profitability caused by import/export imbalances, low freight rates and high fixed slot costs.

The Australasian trade lane was restructured and retonnaged, providing new  vessels with the capability to carry a high percentage of refrigerated containers in late 2002. In 2003 the headquarters moved from Ipswich to the new joint headquarters of CP Ships in Gatwick. A new Contship Logo was designed in 2004 when restructuring the brand/trade lane strategies, however it didn't achieve the public recognition the old one did. In January 2006 the Contship Containerlines brand was replaced by the CP Ships brand following CP's one brand strategy promoted by the "One brand - One team" project, being the last CP Ships brand to be retired. In late 2005 CP Ships was bought up by TUI AG and merged in mid 2006 in the Hapag-Lloyd organization.

Contship Overland
Contship Overland was a division of Contship Containerlines operating in Europe's intermodal industry. The company had offices in Felixstowe, Glasgow and Milan, and worked with partners in Spain and Greece, providing rail freight to key markets and road freight options where required by customers. Its main business consisted of intermodal container and swapbody traffic between the UK and Italy, mostly by rail via the Channel Tunnel. After approximately ten years in business, Contship Overland was sold to the Rotterdam-based intermodal transport operator Geest North Sea Line with effect of 1 October 2001.

Contship Italia Group
When Contship Containerlines was acquired by CP Ships in 1997, the terminal operations in Italy stayed an independent company, not owned by CP. Today, this company acts under the name Contship Italia Group still using the old Contship logo.

International identifiers
SCAC Code: CCXL
Operator Code: CSA
BIC Codes (Container prefixes): CSQU, HAMU,  PLVU, CLGU, TLEU, PSBU, PCRU, FANU (Fantainer)

Vessels
 (applies to pre-1997 vessels only)

 GRT = Gross Register Tonnage / BRT (old unit of measurement)
 GT = Gross Tonnage / BRZ (introduced 18 July 1994)
 TEU = Twenty-foot equivalent units

Contship often re-used vessel names, see the IMO Number.

See also
CP Ships
Hapag-Lloyd

References
 Bureau International des Containers (Container prefix codes, now linking Contship units to Hapag-Lloyd due to the merger)
 SECDatabase.com: CP SHIPS LTD, Form 6-K, Filing Date Sep 7, 2004
 Contship Containerlines Ltd.: Official website - page offline - please refer to History of CP Ships
 Contship Containerlines Ltd.: Celebrating 30 glorious years (printed brochure), 1999
 Contship Containerlines Ltd.: Liner Services Directory (printed brochure), 2000
 CP Ships: Press release - CMA CGM Slot Charter Agreement Brings CP Ships into Europe-Asia Trade, 29. Januar 2001
 CP Ships: Press release - CP Ships Takes Delivery of Contship Aurora, 09. September 2002
 CP Ships: Press release - CP Ships Restructures Australasian Trade Lanes, 04. October 2002
 CP Ships: Press release - CP Ships to Withdraw from Asia-Europe Slot Charter, 17. December 2002
 CP Ships: Press release - CP Ships Adopts a Single Brand, 28. April 2005
 Geest North Sea Line: Press release - Geest acquires Contship Overland operation, 20. September 2001
 Marine Link: Eagle is Landing for Contship Containerlines, 30. September 2002
 Marine Link: Contship Containerlines Wins Third Party Endorsement, 13. December 2002
 Shippers Today: Contship Containerlines' mobile advertising, 1999
 SMDG Group (Carrier codes for EDIFACT messages, now having replaced Contship with Hapag-Lloyd due to the merger)

External links
Contship Italia Group
Diario Contship Italia (in Italian)

Container shipping companies of the United Kingdom
Container shipping companies
Defunct shipping companies
Transport companies established in 1968
Swiss companies established in 1968